Dominican Convent Primary School may refer to:
 Dominican Convent Primary School, Bulawayo an independent prep school in Bulawayo, Zimbabwe
 Dominican Convent Primary School, Harare, an independent prep school in Bulawayo, Zimbabwe